Colin Dayan, also known as Joan Dayan, is the Robert Penn Warren Professor in the Humanities at Vanderbilt University, where she teaches American studies, comparative literature, and the religious and legal history of the Americas. 

She has written extensively on prison law and torture, Caribbean culture and literary history, as well as on Haitian poetics, Edgar Allan Poe, and the history of slavery. After receiving her Ph.D. from the City University of New York Graduate Center in 1980, she taught at Princeton University, Yale University, the City University of New York, the University of Arizona, and the University of Pennsylvania. She received a Guggenheim Fellowship in 2004 and was elected to the American Academy of Arts and Sciences in 2012.

Dayan is the author of eight books. Her literary history work includes a 1977 English translation of René Depestre's A Rainbow for the Christian West and the 1987 book Fables of Mind: An Inquiry into Poe's Fiction, which discusses themes of knowledge and identity in Edgar Allan Poe's short stories. 

Her book Haiti, History, and the Gods (1995) reorients the study of Haitian history through what she calls "literary fieldwork". In the process, she recasts many boundaries: between politics and poetics, between the secular and the sacred, and between the colonizer and the colonized, those who deemed themselves masters and those who worked as slaves.

Dayan has written multiple books which focus on animal rights issues and human-dog socialization as extended metaphors for imprisonment, racism and non-human personhood. These works include The Story of Cruel and Unusual (2007), pit bull fighting in The Law is a White Dog: How Legal Rituals Make and Unmake Persons (2011), and canine representation in media in With Dogs at the Edge of Life (2016) . Dayan has also written about pit bull profiling for publications such as The Conversation. This work has been criticized for historical inaccuracies.

Her memoirs In the Belly of Her Ghost (2019) and Animal Quintet (2020) use nature and animal imagery to evoke "the uncanny power of physical objects", framing her Haitian heritage and her childhood in the American South in the context of human treatment of animals.

References

External links
Law School Bio
"A Devilish Way of Thinking", Boston Review
"Into the Crud", Public Books
"Destroying the Soul", The Washington Post
"Barbarous Confinement", The New York Times
"Dead Dogs: Breed bans, euthanasia, and preemptive justice", Boston Review
"Civilizing Haiti", Boston Review
"Dangerous Dogs", London Review of Books
"Between the Devil and the Deep Sea", Boston Review
"Out of Defeat: Aimé Césaire's Miraculous Words", Boston Review
"The Story of Cruel and Unusual"
"Words Behind Bars", Boston Review
"Cruel and Unusual", Boston Review
Lecture "The Story of Cruel and Unusual" (November 7, 2007)
Lecture "Words Behind Bars" (May 8, 2008)
Colin Dayan Website

Year of birth missing (living people)
Living people
Graduate Center, CUNY alumni
Princeton University faculty
Yale University faculty
City University of New York faculty
University of Arizona faculty
University of Pennsylvania faculty
Vanderbilt University faculty
Fellows of the American Academy of Arts and Sciences